Glaucocharis ochracealis is a moth in the family Crambidae. It was described by Francis Walker in 1866. It is found in Australia, where it has been recorded from New South Wales.

References

Diptychophorini
Moths described in 1866